Tømmerstø is a neighbourhood in the city of Kristiansand in Agder county, Norway. It's located in the borough of Oddernes and in the district of Randesund. The neighborhood of Odderhei lies to the northwest, Holte and Frikstad lie to the northeast, and Kongshavn lies to the southeast.

It is located with the shore in a typical Southern Norway archipelago. The neighborhood is mostly located with large houses and some villas. Tømmerstø is a popular tourist area in the summer with a lot of cabins for rent, The Royal Family of Norway owns a cottage in Tømmerstø. Islands like Herøya, Teistholmen, and Furuholmen are located just offshore.

There are three schools in the area: Dvergsnes skole (an elementary school), Sørlandet Maritime videregående school (a high school), and a junior high school in Holte.

Media gallery

References

Geography of Kristiansand
Neighbourhoods of Kristiansand